The following lists events that happened during 1998 in Chile.

Incumbents
President of Chile: Eduardo Frei Ruiz-Tagle

Events

March
29 March – In tennis, Marcelo Ríos becomes the World #1 player after claiming the Lipton Championships men's singles title against Andre Agassi.

April
17 April – The Chile–Mexico Free Trade Agreement is signed. 
18–19 April – 2nd Summit of the Americas

October
10 October – Augusto Pinochet is indicted for human rights violations.

Deaths
7 December – Carlos Oviedo Cavada (b. 1927)

References 

 
Years of the 20th century in Chile
Chile